Though Zen is said to be based on a "special transmission outside scriptures" which "did not stand upon words", the Zen-tradition has a rich doctrinal and textual background. It has been influenced by sutras such as the Lankavatara Sutra, the Vimalakirti Sutra, the Avatamsaka Sutra, and the Lotus Sutra.

Subsequently, the Zen tradition produced a rich corpus of written literature which has become a part of its practice and teaching, including the Platform Sutra, lineage charts, collected sayings of Zen-masters, and the koan-literature.

The role of scripture in Zen
Contrary to the popular image, literature does play a role in the Zen-training. Unsui, Zen-monks, "are expected to become familiar with the classics of the Zen canon". A review of the early historical documents and literature of early Zen masters clearly reveals that they were well versed in numerous Mahāyāna Buddhist sūtras.

Nevertheless, Zen is often pictured as anti-intellectual. This picture of Zen emerged during the Song dynasty (960–1297), when Chán became the dominant form of Buddhism in China, and gained great popularity among the educated and literary classes of Chinese society. The use of koans, which are highly stylized literary texts, reflects this popularity among the higher classes.

In the tenth century, during the turmoil of the Five Dynasties and Ten Kingdoms period, regionally oriented schools with differing views on the Chán-identity developed. One view was that of jiaowai biechuan (教外別傳), "a special transmission outside the teaching". The opposing view was jiaochan yizhi (教禪一致), "the harmony between Chán and the teaching". The view of the harmony between Chán and the teachings was dominant in the lineage of Fa-ten Wen-i (885-958), and prevailed in the Southern Kingdoms in the tenth century. Thereafter the notion of a "special transmission outside the teachings" became dominant.

The famous saying "do not establish words and letters", attributed in this period to Bodhidharma,

The Chán of the Tang dynasty, especially that of Mazu and Linji with its emphasis on "shock techniques", in retrospect was seen as a golden age of Chán. This picture has gained great popularity in the west in the 20th century, especially due to the influence of D.T. Suzuki. This picture has been challenged, and changed, since the 1970s by "modern scientific research" on Zen.

The Zen tradition, especially Rinzai Zen, aims to give a direct transmission of insight, and stresses the impossibility of giving any positive statement of this insight. This is famously worded in a 12th-century stanza, attributed to Bodhidharma:

An example of this non-dependence on words and scripture in 9th century China is Teshan (Tokusan 780–865). He became famous for burning his commentaries on the Diamond sutra, when he realized that his attachment to these commentaries had become a stumbling block on his way to gaining insight.

Hisamatsu states it more bluntly:

Masao Abe points out that the role of the intellect in the understanding of Zen should not be misunderstood:

Arokiasamy warns against this

The importance given to Zen's non-reliance on written words is also often misunderstood as an opposition to the study of Buddhist texts. However, Zen is deeply rooted in the teachings and doctrines of Mahāyāna Buddhism and gradually developed its own literature. What the Zen tradition emphasizes is that enlightenment of the Buddha came not through conceptualization, but rather through direct insight:

But direct insight has to be supported by study and understanding (hori of the Buddhist teachings and texts. Hakuin goes as far as to state that the buddhist path even starts with study: 

Intellectual understanding without practice is called yako-zen, "wild fox Zen", but "one who has only experience without intellectual understanding is a zen temma, "Zen devil"".

Grounding Chán in scripture
The early Buddhist schools in China were each based on a specific sutra. At the beginning of the Tang dynasty, by the time of the Fifth Patriarch Hongren (601–674), the Zen school became established as a separate school of Buddhism. It had to develop a doctrinal tradition of its own to ascertain its position, and to ground its teachings in a specific sutra. Various sutras were used for this, even before the time of Hongren: the Śrīmālādevī Sūtra (Huike), Awakening of Faith (Daoxin), the Lankavatara Sutra (East Mountain School), the Diamond Sutra (Shenhui), the Platform Sutra. Subsequently, the Zen tradition produced a rich corpus of written literature which has become a part of its practice and teaching.

Other influential sutras are the Vimalakirti Sutra, Avatamsaka Sutra, the Shurangama Sutra, and the Mahaparinirvana Sutra.

The growing Chán tradition also faced the challenge to put its teachings into words, to bolster its identity and to apply it in formal teaching settings, without losing the central insight into the "suchness" of reality. One solution to this was the shift of emphasis from the recorded sayings of the historical Buddha, to the sayings of living Buddhas, namely the Chán masters. In time, these sayings, from the so-called "encounter-dialogues" between masters and students, but also from sermons, became codified and formed the basis of typical Zen-genres, namely the "yü-lü" (recorded sayings) and the classic koan-collections. These too became formalised, and as such became a subject of disputes on the right way to teach Zen and the avoidance of dependence on words.

Influential sutras

Lankavatara Sutra
In its beginnings in China, Zen primarily referred to the Mahāyāna sūtras and especially to the Laṅkāvatāra Sūtra. As a result, early masters of the Zen tradition were referred to as "Laṅkāvatāra masters". As the Laṅkāvatāra Sūtra teaches the doctrine of the "One Vehicle" (Skt. Ekayāna), the early Zen school was sometimes referred to as the "One Vehicle School". In other early texts, the school that would later become known as Zen is sometimes even referred to as simply the "Laṅkāvatāra school" (Ch. 楞伽宗, Léngqié Zōng). Accounts recording the history of this early period are to be found in Records of the Laṅkāvatāra Masters (Ch. 楞伽師資記, Léngqié Shīzī Jì).

Diamond Sutra
During the Tang dynasty, the Zen school's central text shifted to the Diamond Sūtra (Vajracchedikā Prajñāpāramitā Sūtra). Thereafter, the essential texts of the Zen school were often considered to be the Laṅkāvatāra Sūtra and the Diamond Sūtra.

The reasons for this shift are not clear. Whalen Lai writes:

Kalupahana does see a struggle to give clues to students about ultimate reality, without going back to scripture (e.g. the Lankavatara-sutra). According to him, the use of kung-an's served this role.  The prajnaparamita-sutras are a reaction against the early Buddhist philosophical schools, especially the realistic approach of the Sarvastivadins, and a return to the notion of non-substantiality. According to Kalupahana, also in Chán the use of...

Vimalakirti Sutra
The Vimalakirti Sutra is an early Mahayana Sutra dating from the second century CE. The sutra centers on the person of the householder Vimalakirti, who's being visited by various bodhisattvas while he's ill.

The Vimalakirti Sutra stresses that...

The sutra is grounded on the prajnaparamita-teachings on emptiness. This is the central theme in "the dialogue between the bodhisattvas and Vimalakirti on the subject of nonduality". While discussing this subject, the bodhisattvas give a variety of answers. Manjusri is the last bodhisattva to answer, who says that "by giving an explanation they have already fallen into dualism". Vimalakirti, in his turn, answers with silence. 

This silence became paradigmatic for the Chán-tradition:

Avatamsaka Sutra
The Avatamsaka Sutra is a compilation of sutras of various length. The earliest of these texts, the Daśabhūmika Sūtra, maybe dates from the first century CE. The Daśabhūmika Sūtra describes the ten stages on the Bodhisattva-path. The various sutras were probably joined together shortly before its translation into Chinese, at the beginning of the 5th century CE.

The Avatamsaka ("garland", string of flowers) sutra integrates the teachings on sunyata and vijnaptimatra (mind-only). The Huayan school, that originated in the same period as Chán, and influenced the Chán-school, was based on the Avatamsaka Sutra.

The basic idea of the Avatamsaka Sutra is the unity of the absolute and the relative:

Each part of the world reflects the totality of the cosmos:

All levels of reality are related and interpenetrated. This is depicted in the image of Indra's net. This "unity in totality allows every individual entity of the phenomenal world its uniqueness without attributing an inherent nature to anything".

The Hua-yen school persistently influenced Chán. Tsung-mi, the Fifth Patriarch of the Hua-yen school, also occupies a prominent position in the history of Chán. During the Song, the Hua-yen metaphysics were completely assimilated by the Chán-school.

The Avatamsaka Sutra is being referred to, directly or indirectly, in Chán-writings. Xinxin Ming's Faith in mind is "in many passages [...] akin to the Avatamsaka sutra, especially the closing stanzas". Tsung-mi's writings reflect his Hua-yen influences.

Zen literature
The Zen-tradition developed a rich textual tradition, based on the interpretation of the Buddhist teachings and the recorded sayings of Zen-masters.

Chinese texts

Introduction
Chan literature (Chinese: 禪宗文學, often specifically 禪宗語錄, lit. Chan's selected sayings) is a genre of Chinese buddhism literature popularized by the school of Zen (禪, in Mandarin spelling, Chan) in Tang dynasty. The three most studied Chinese texts, according to a comprehensive survey of 477 papers in 2017, are the Anthology of the Patriarchal Hall (38%), the Compendium of Five Lamps (9%) and the Transmission of the Lamp (6%).

Hui-neng's Platform Sutra

Platform Sutra of the Sixth Patriarch is an early Chan text, dating back to at least the 8th century, attributed to Huineng. It is...

The Platform Sūtra cites and explains a wide range of Buddhist scriptures: the Diamond Sūtra, the Lotus Sūtra (Saddharma Puṇḍarīka Sūtra), the Vimalakīrti Nirdeśa Sūtra, the Śūraṅgama Sūtra, the Laṅkāvatāra Sūtra, the Awakening of Faith in the Mahayana-sutra, and the Mahaparinirvana Sutra.

Transmission of the Lamp

The Chán-tradition developed from the established tradition of "Canonical Buddhism", which "remained normative for all later Chinese Buddhism". It was established by the end of the sixth century, as a result of the Chinese developing understanding of Buddhism in the previous centuries. One of the inventions of this Canonical Buddhism were transmission lists, called "Transmission of the Lamp", a literary device to establish a lineage. Both T'ien Tai and Chán took over this literary device, to lend authority to those developing traditions, and guarantee its authenticity:

Another literary device for establishing those traditions was given by the Kao-seng-chuan (Biographies of Eminent Monks), compiles around 530. The Chán-tradition developed its own corpus in this genre, with works as Anthology of the Patriarchal Hall (952) and the Jingde Records of the Transmission of the Lamp (published 1004). McRae considers Dumoulin's A History of Zen to be a modern example of this genre, disguised as scientific history.

Chán transmission records, teng-lu, were essential in shaping the identity of Chán. The Records of the Transmission of the Lamp (Ching-te ch'uan-teng lu), compiled by Tao-yün and published in 1004, introduced several of the key elements of the Chán-tradition. Another key text is the "Record of the Extensive Transmission [of the Lamp] compiled during the T'ien-sheng era" (T'ien-sheng kuang-teng lu), compiled by Li Tsun-hsü and published in 1036, which clearly introduced the idea of "a special transmission outside the teaching". Until the T'ien-sheng kuang-teng lu, Chán was viewed as a teaching in harmony with the Buddhist scriptural tradition. In the tenth century, during the turmoil of the Five Dynasties and Ten Kingdoms period, regionally oriented schools with differing views on the Chán-identity developed. One view was that of chiao-wai pieh-ch'uan, "a special transmission outside the teaching". The opposing view was chiao-ch'an i-chih, "the harmony between Chán and the teaching". The view of the harmony between Chán and the teachings was dominant in the lineage of Fa-ten Wen-i (885-958), and prevailed in the Southern Kingdoms in the tenth century.

The original preface to the Ching-te ch'uan-teng lu by Tao-yüan reflects this Fa-yen position of harmony with the teachings. It was replaced by an introduction by Yang I, which emphasised "a special practice outside the teaching":

The differences go back to the interpretation of the Long Scroll of the Treatise on the Two Entrances and Four Practices, a text attributed to Bodhidharma. In this text, the "entrance by principle" (li-ju) is characterized in two ways:

The first statement can be seen as a support of the harmony between the teachings and Chán. The second statement can be seen as a support of a "special transmission outside the teachings".

Recorded Sayings and Encounter Dialogue
From the "question-and-answer format that had been developed as a means of conveying Buddhist teachings" developed the "yü-lü" genre, the recorded sayings of the masters, and the encounter dialogues. The best-known example is the "Lin-ji yü-lü". These recorded sayings are not verbatim recordings of the sayings of the masters, but well-edited texts, written down up to 160 years after the supposed sayings and meetings.

Linji yulu

The Linji yulu ("Zhenzhou Linji Huizhao Chansi yulu") is the seminal text of the Linji and Rinzai school. It contains the recorded sayings attributed to Linji Yixuan (d. 866). It was published in 1120, but developed in a period stretching from 952 to 1120. The first mention of Linji is in the Zutang ji (祖堂集 "Anthology of the Patriarchal Hall), compiled in 952, 86 years after Linji's death. The Jingde Chuangdeng lu (景德傳燈錄 "Jingde Records of the Transmission of the Lamp"), compiled in 1004 by Daoyuan, gives brief biographical information on Lijni, followed by Linji's interactions with Hunagbo, to strengthen the claim of Linji's descendancy form Hunagbo and the Mazu-lineage. The Tiansheng Guangdeng lu (天聖廣燈錄), "Tiansheng Era Expanded Lamp Record", compiled by the official Li Zunxu (李遵勗)(988-1038) confirms the status of Shoushan Shengnian, but also pictures Linji as a major Chan patriarch and heir to the Hongzhou school of Mazu Daoyi, displacing the prominence of the Fayan-lineage. It also established the slogan of "a special transmission outside the teaching", supporting the Linji-school claim of "Chan as separate from and superior to all other Buddhist teachings". The Sijia yulu, ("Discourse Records of the Four Masters"), compiled 1066-1069 by Huanglong Huinan (1002–1069), contains the discourse records of Mazu Daoyi (709–788), Baizhang Huaihai (720–814), Huangbo Xiyun (died 850) and Linji, the major patriarchs of the Tang dynasty according to the Linji faction. In this text, Linji is explicitly placed in line with these teachers of the Hongzhou school. The Zhenzhou Linji Huizhao Chansi yulu ("The record of Linji"), compiled by Yuanjue Zongan in 1120, is the classic version of the record of Linji. Yuanjue Zongan belonged to the Yunmen-faction, and also re-issued the Yunmen yulu, the "Discourse Records of Yunmen". The separate publication of Linji's records signals the newly acquired status of Linji as one of Chán's major patriarchs.

Koan-collections

The "encounter dialogue"-genre developed into various collections of kōans, which form itself another extensive literary corpus.

Koan practice developed from a literary practice, styling snippets of encounter-dialogue into well-edited stories. It arose in interaction with "educated literati". There were dangers involved in such a literary approach, such as fixing specific meanings to the cases. Dahui Zonggao is even said to have burned the woodblocks of the Blue Cliff Record, for the hindrance it had become to study of Chán by his students.

The two best known koan-collections (in the West) are the "Gateless Gate" and the "Blue Cliff Record". The Gateless Gate (Chinese: 無門關 Wumenguan; Japanese: Mumonkan) is a collection of 48 kōans and commentaries published in 1228 by Chinese monk Wumen (無門) (1183–1260). The title may be more accurately rendered as Gateless Barrier or Gateless Checkpoint). The Blue Cliff Record (Chinese: 碧巖錄 Bìyán Lù; Japanese: Hekiganroku) is a collection of 100 kōans compiled in 1125 by Yuanwu Keqin (圜悟克勤 1063–1135).

Japanese texts
The Japanese Zen-tradition also developed a corpus of its own. During the Tokugawa-period Dōgen's Shōbōgenzō became the authoritative text of the Soto-school. In the Rinzai-school, the koan-curricula were systematized by dharma-heirs of Hakuin, who himself produced an extended corpus of written texts.

Dogen's Shōbōgenzō
During the Tokugawa-period the Soto-school started to place a growing emphasis on textual authority. In 1615 the bakufu declared that "Eheiji's standards (kakun) must be the rule for all Soto monks". In time this came to mean all the writings of Dogen, which thereby became the normative source for the doctrines and organisation of the Soto-school.

A key factor in this growing emphasis on Dogen was Manzan's appeal to change the rules for dharma transmission, based on arguments derived from the Shōbōgenzō. Another reformation was implemented by Gento Sokuchu (1729–1807), who tried to purify the Soto-school of the use of koans. Gento Sokuchu implanted new regulations, based on Dogen's regulations.

This growing status of Dogen as textual authority also posed a problem for the Soto-school:

During the Meiji Restoration, the memory of Dōgen was used to ensure Eihei-ji's central place in the Soto-organisation, and "to cement closer ties with lay people". In 1899 the first lay ordination ceremony was organized in Eihei-ji. Eihei-ji also promoted the study of Dōgen's works, especially the Shōbōgenzō, which changed the view of Dōgen in Soto's history.

Zenshū Shiburoku
The Zenshū Shiburoku, The Four Texts of the Zen Sect, is a collection of four essential Zen texts which are being used in Japan as introductory texts in the education of novice Zen monks. The collection consists of the Jūgyūzu (Ten Oxherding Pictures), the Shinjinmei (Faith in mind), attributed to the third Chinese Chán-patriarch Sengcan, the Shōdōka (Song of Enlightenment), attributed to Yongjia Xuanjue, and the Zazengi (The Principles of Zazen), written by Dogen.

See also
 Zen
 Chinese Chan

Notes

References

Written references

Web references

Sources

 
 
 
 
 
 
 
 {{Citation | last =Buswell | first =Robert E. | year =1991 | chapter =The "Short-cut" Approach of K'an-hua Meditation: The Evolution of a Practical Subitism in Chinese Ch'an Buddhism |editor-first= Peter N. |editor-last=Gregory |title=Sudden and Gradual. Approaches to Enlightenment in Chinese Thought | place =Delhi | publisher =Motilal Banarsidass Publishers}}
 
 
 
 
 
 
 
 
 
 
 
 
 

 
 
 
 
 
 
 
 
 
 
 
 
 
 
 
 
 
 
 
 
 
 * 
 
 
 
 
 
 
 
 
 
 
 
 
 
 
 
 
 
 
 
 
 
 
 
 
 
 
 
 
 
 
 
 
 
 
 

Further reading
 Dumoulin, Heinrich (2005), Zen Buddhism: A History. Volume 1: India and China. World Wisdom Books. .
 Dumoulin, Heinrich (2005), Zen Buddhism: A History. Volume 2: Japan''. World Wisdom Books. .
 .
 . (This book was printed with invalid ISBNs.)
 .

External links
 Zen Buddhism WWW Virtual Library
 The Zen Site